The 2021 Vietnamese National Cup (known as the Bamboo Airways National Cup for sponsorship reasons) was the 29th edition of the Vietnamese Cup, the football knockout competition of Vietnam organized by the Vietnam Football Federation.

Only the first round was completed, after disruptions to the event due to an outbreak of the delta variant of the coronavirus in the country. After a meeting with all teams on August 21, the event was officially cancelled, with the slot for the 2022 AFC Champions League to be determined at a later stage.

First round
Five teams (Than Quang Ninh FC, Ho Chi Minh City FC, Viettel Football Club, Hanoi FC and Nam Dinh FC) received a bye in the first round.

References

Vietnamese National Cup
Vietnam
Cup